The Ipiranga River is a tributary of the Iriri River in Pará state in north-central Brazil.

The river rises in the  Nascentes da Serra do Cachimbo Biological Reserve, a strictly protected conservation unit established in 2005. It is one of the headwaters of the Xingu River.

See also
List of rivers of Pará

References

Brazilian Ministry of Transport

Rivers of Pará